Edgar Frederick King (25 February 1914 – 1993) was an English professional footballer who played for Tottenham Juniors, Tufnell Park, Northfleet United and Tottenham Hotspur.

Football career 
King began his career at Tottenham Juniors before joining non-League Tufnell Park. After a spell with the Tottenham Hotspur "nursery" team Northfleet United  the left back signed for Tottenham in 1934. He went on to play one match for the Spurs.

References 

1914 births
1993 deaths
Footballers from Hackney, London
English footballers
Association football fullbacks
Tufnell Park F.C. players
Northfleet United F.C. players
Tottenham Hotspur F.C. players
English Football League players